Creosote gall midges are a species of gall-inducing flies in the Asphondylia auripila group (Diptera: Cecidomyiidae). This group consists of 15 closely related species of flies which inhabit creosote bush (Zygophyllaceae: Larrea tridentata) sensu lato. They have partitioned the plant ecologically with different gall midge species inhabiting the leaves, stems, buds, and flowers of creosote bush. Each species induces a uniquely shaped gall but the insects are otherwise morphologically very similar and very difficult to tell apart.

Their life cycle begins when the female oviposits into the part of the plant which her species prefers, she inserts her egg along with a fungal spore from a mycangia (a small pocket to store fungal spores). A gall forms and the fungal mycelium grows to line the inside of the gall, when the egg hatches the developing larva feeds upon the fungus. Adult emergence is timed with periods of plant growth associated with winter, spring, or summer rain fall. In contrast to many other groups of plant-feeding insects (which form new species through changes to new host plants) the evolution of new species in the A. auripila group seems to be a result of colonizing new parts of the same plant and/or colonization of new seasons of plant growth.

List of species
The Asphondylia genus has over 60 described species.  Within the genus the creosote gall midge species form a species group, the A. auripila group.
Species described this far (by host-plant part) include:

 Asphondylia clavata – leaf gall
 Asphondylia pilosa – leaf gall
 Asphondylia villosa – leaf gall
 Asphondylia barbata – leaf gall
 Asphondylia digitata – leaf gall
 Asphondylia discalis – leaf gall
 Asphondylia silicula – leaf gall
 Asphondylia fabalis – leaf gall
 Asphondylia bullata – stem gall
 Asphondylia resinosa – stem gall
 Asphondylia foliosa – stem gall
 Asphondylia auripila – stem gall
 Asphondylia rosetta – stem gall
 Asphondylia florea – flower gall
 Asphondylia apicata – bud gall

References
Gagne, R.J, and Waring, G. 1990. The Asphondylia (Cecidomyiidae: Diptera) of creosote bush (Larrea tridentata) in North America. Proc. Entomol. Soc. Wash. 92:649–671.

Cecidomyiidae
Insect common names